Spuk im Reich der Schatten is a German television series.

See also
Spuk aus der Gruft (1997)
Spuk am Tor der Zeit (2002)
List of German television series

External links
 

German children's television series
German fantasy television series
2000 German television series debuts
2000 German television series endings
German-language television shows